Norddeich is a railway station located in Norddeich, Lower Saxony, Germany. The station lies on the Emsland Railway (Rheine - Norddeich) and the train services are operated by Deutsche Bahn.

Train services
The station is served by the following service(s):

Intercity services (IC ): Norddeich - Emden - Münster - Düsseldorf - Köln - Bonn - Koblenz - Mainz - Mannheim - Stuttgart
Intercity services (IC ): Norddeich - Emden - Münster - Düsseldorf - Köln - Bonn - Koblenz - Mainz - Mannheim - Karlsruhe - Konstanz
Intercity services (IC ): Norddeich - Emden - Bremen - Hanover - Braunschweig - Magdeburg - Leipzig
Regional services : Norddeich - Emden - Leer - Oldenburg - Bremen - Nienburg - Hanover

References

Railway stations in Lower Saxony
Railway stations in Germany opened in 1892